The People's Choice: From Washington to Harding; A Study in Democracy is a book by historian Herbert Agar, published by Houghton Mifflin, 1933. It won the 1934 Pulitzer Prize for History.

1933 non-fiction books
Pulitzer Prize for History-winning works
Books about presidents of the United States